NYU Langone Hospital – Long Island is a hospital in Mineola, New York that is the Long Island hospital base of NYU Langone Health System.  It was previously known as Nassau Hospital and later Winthrop-University Hospital.

Activities 
It is ranked by U.S. News & World Report as one of the top-10 New York metro-area hospitals.  It is currently a 591-bed medical academic center and ACS Level 1 Trauma Center. The hospital features more than 75 divisions of specialty care, offering comprehensive inpatient and outpatient programs and services to address every stage of life.

NYU Langone Hospital – Long Island also has a Research Institute that conducts robust research and studies that are helping to shape the future of medicine. The hospital, with ties to New York University, blends the progressive philosophy and advances of a teaching and research institution with a personal approach to patient care that is the cornerstone of the organization.

The NYU Langone Hospital – Long Island campus is also home to the new NYU Long Island School of Medicine—a tuition-free school with an accelerated three-year curriculum devoted exclusively to training primary care physicians.  It agreed to merge into the NYU Langone Health System in 2016.

History 
The hospital was founded in 1896 as Long Island's first hospital.  It was originally named Nassau Hospital, but the name was changed to Winthrop-University Hospital in 1985 due to confusion with Nassau County Medical Center.  The name was chosen to honor the Winthrop family, including Robert Winthrop, an investment banker and former president of the hospital who was a descendant of John Winthrop, and his uncle and wife.

In 1996, it became part of the Winthrop South Nassau University Health System, alongside South Nassau Communities Hospital (now Mount Sinai South Nassau). In 2003, the Winthrop South Nassau System became part of New York Presbyterian.

In 2017, Winthrop became affiliated with NYU Langone, becoming NYU Winthrop. By 2019, a full asset merger between NYU and Winthrop had been complete. In November 2020, it was announced that the hospital changed its name to NYU Langone Hospital - Long Island.

The details of the Winthrop South Nassau departure from New York Presbyterian are unclear. The details of the Winthrop-South Nassau breakup are also unclear, but the two hospitals are now affiliated with different health systems.

Deaths

 James Barton (1890–1962).
 Duane Jones (1937–1988).
 Cornelius W. Wickersham (1885–1968).

External links 

 NYU Winthrop Hospital
 NYU Langone Medical Center
 NYU Long Island School of Medicine

References

Hospital buildings completed in 1900
Mineola, New York
Hospitals in New York (state)
Hospitals established in 1896
Buildings and structures in Nassau County, New York
Voluntary hospitals
New York University
Trauma centers